Reviews in American History is a quarterly peer-reviewed academic journal established in 1973 and published by the Johns Hopkins University Press. It publishes reviews of new books on the topic of American history, as well as retrospectives on influential titles of the past. All areas of American history, including political, military, economic, gender, religious, social, cultural, legal, intellectual, artistic, and philosophical, are covered. The current editor-in-chief is Ari Kelman of the University of California, Davis.

Abstracting and indexing 
The journal is abstracted and indexed in:

External links 
 

History of the United States journals
Publications established in 1973
Quarterly journals
Johns Hopkins University Press academic journals
English-language journals